Protein phosphatase inhibitor 2 is an enzyme that in humans is encoded by the PPP1R2 gene.

Interactions 

PPP1R2 has been shown to interact with LMTK2 and PPP1R9B.

References

Further reading